Lobby may refer to:

 Lobby (room), an entranceway or foyer in a building
 Lobbying, the action or the group used to influence a viewpoint to politicians
 Lobbying in the United States, specific to the United States
 Lobby (food), a thick stew made in Leigh, Greater Manchester and North Staffordshire, like Lancashire Hotpot
 Lobby (band), a Slovak Eurodance band
 The Lobby, (UK) parliamentary journalists receiving privileged political access in exchange for sourcing anonymity
 Lobby Hero, a play by Kenneth Lonergan
 Hotel Lobby, an oil painting on canvas by American realist painter Edward Hopper
 The Lobby (improv), an improvisational comedy group based in Southern California
 The Lobby, a documentary series by Al Jazeera
 The Lobby, a film by Fathia Absie

People with the name
 "Lobby", nickname of Seymour de Lotbiniere (1905–1984), English broadcasting executive and pioneer of outside broadcasts
 Lobby Loyde (1941–2007), Australian rock music guitarist, songwriter and producer

Fictional characters
 Lobby Lud, a fictional character invented in August 1927 by the British newspaper Westminster Gazette

See also 
 Lobi (disambiguation)